XHHAC-FM (La Mejor 100.7) is a Regional Mexican radio station in Ciudad Acuña, Coahuila.

History
XHHAC received its concession on November 17, 1988. It was owned by Ricardo Espejo Munguía and later sold to Grupo RCG. In 2010, the station was sold to Grupo Radio Grande, a new radio group; the owner is now known as XH Medios.

At some point, XHHAC flipped from one grupera format to another, dropping Televisa Radio's Ke Buena for La Mejor from MVS Radio.

References

Radio stations in Coahuila
Regional Mexican radio stations
Mass media in Ciudad Acuña